Tilden is an unincorporated community in Dallas County, in the U.S. state of Missouri.

History
A post office called Tilden was established in 1887, and remained in operation until 1920. The community has the name of Samuel J. Tilden (1814–1886), American politician and candidate in the highly contested 1876 Presidential election.

References

Unincorporated communities in Dallas County, Missouri
Unincorporated communities in Missouri